Lang Yongchun (born 23 July 1971) is a former Chinese news anchor best known for his work at China Central Television (CCTV), the main state broadcaster of China. He was best known in China as the announcer for the 7:00 pm CCTV News program Xinwen Lianbo, between 2011 and 2015.

Biography
Lang was born in Suining County, Jiangsu in July 1971, he graduated from Nanjing University of Chinese Medicine and Communication University of China.

Lang joined the China Central Television in 1995, he hosted the mid-day newscast News 30 Minutes and Morning News. Beginning in 2011 he became a major anchor on the evening Xinwen Lianbo program, considered the most important news program in the country.

In 2011, Lang Yongchun's wife was eventually diagnosed as suffering from breast cancer, she is currently being treated in the United States. In order to take care of her and their son, who was studying in the United States, Lang Yongchun resigned on September 3, 2015. On September 2, after he had already tendered his resignation to CCTV, he nonetheless anchored that evening's Xinwen Lianbo program.

On October 5, 2017, Lang was arrested in Beijing for drunk driving.

Works

Television
 News 30 Minutes
 Xinwen Lianbo

Book
 Love, Yongchun

Personal life
Lang married his classmate Wu Ping in 1997, they have a son, Lang Yu.

References

External links
 

1971 births
People from Xuzhou
Communication University of China alumni
Living people
CCTV newsreaders and journalists